Rasheed Wesley Sulaimon (born March 9, 1994) is an American-Nigerian professional basketball player for Konyaspor of BSL. He was selected as a McDonald's All-American as well as a Jordan Brand Classic All-American in 2012. He was the primary reserve off the bench for the Duke Blue Devils men's basketball team during the 2014–15 season before being dismissed from the team on January 29, 2015. He subsequently transferred to Maryland for his senior season.

College recruitment
Receiving offers from many colleges around the country, including North Carolina, Arizona, Baylor, Texas, and Texas A&M, Sulaimon committed to Duke on February 10, 2011 during an unofficial visit, signing a National Letter of Intent on November 9, 2011.

|}

College career
Sulaimon was dismissed from the Duke basketball program on January 29, 2015, after appearing in 90 games over three seasons. He was the first player ever dismissed by coach Mike Krzyzewski for failing to meet the standards set for a Duke basketball player. It was later revealed that two women had accused Sulaimon of sexual assault in the months preceding his eventual dismissal.

Sulaimon transferred to Maryland for his senior season, where in 36 games, he averaged 11.3 points on .425 shooting from three-point range, 3.5 rebounds and 3.5 assists in 32.9 minutes per game, garnering a 2015–16 All-Big Ten honorable mention.

Professional career
After going undrafted in the 2016 NBA draft, Sulaimon joined the Chicago Bulls for the 2016 NBA Summer League. On September 7, 2016, he signed with the Charlotte Hornets, but was waived on October 22 after appearing in four preseason games. On October 31, he was acquired by the Greensboro Swarm of the NBA Development League as an affiliate player of the Hornets.

On July 3, 2020, he has signed with Casademont Zaragoza of the Liga ACB. On October 8, Sulaimon was ruled out between six and eight weeks after injuring his leg.

On July 1, 2021, he has signed with JL Bourg of LNB Pro A.

On July 15, 2022, he has signed with Konyaspor of the Turkish Basketbol Süper Ligi (BSL).

National team career
Sulaimon was selected for the Nigeria national basketball team in November 2020, to play in the AfroBasket 2021 qualification. He was forced to miss the games due to a leg injury, however.

Awards and honors

Club
JDA Dijon
LNB Pro A Leaders Cup: (2020)
LNB Pro A Leaders Cup MVP: (2020)

High school
2011 All American Championship
2011 Nike Global Challenge
2011 ESPN Boost Mobile Elite 24
2012 McDonald's All-American
2012 Jordan Brand Classic All American
2012 First-team Parade All-American
2012 Guy V. Lewis Award winner

References

External links
Maryland Terrapins bio
Duke Blue Devils bio

1994 births
Living people
American expatriate basketball people in France
American expatriate basketball people in Spain
American men's basketball players
Basketball players from Houston
Basket Zaragoza players
Duke Blue Devils men's basketball players
Greensboro Swarm players
JDA Dijon Basket players
JL Bourg-en-Bresse players
Liga ACB players
Maryland Terrapins men's basketball players
McDonald's High School All-Americans
Nigerian men's basketball players
Parade High School All-Americans (boys' basketball)
Metropolitans 92 players
Shooting guards
Strake Jesuit College Preparatory alumni